Albert Teich Jr. (February 22, 1929 – October 2, 2010) was an American lawyer and politician.

Teich was born in Norfolk, Virginia. He went to the College of William & Mary and University of Virginia. He served in the United States Air Force during the Korean War. He then went to the University of Virginia School of Law and was admitted to the Virginia bar. He practice law in Norfolk and taught at the Old Dominion University. Teich served in the Virginia House of Delegates from 1972 to 1974 and was a Republican. After that, he made orphanage for underprivileged children. He then served as clerk of the Norfolk Circuit Court from 1996 to 2004.

Notes

1929 births
2010 deaths
Politicians from Norfolk, Virginia
Military personnel from Norfolk, Virginia
Virginia lawyers
College of William & Mary alumni
University of Virginia alumni
Old Dominion University faculty
Republican Party members of the Virginia House of Delegates